Kenneth Johnson (14 October 1928 – 12 December 2015) was a British athlete who competed in the 3,000m steeplechase at the 1952 Summer Olympics.

Born in Leicester, Johnson was a cross country runner, competing for the Leicester Colleges of Art and Technology team, before taking up steeplechase in 1951. He was selected for the Great Britain team at the 1952 Olympics in Helsinki, finishing in seventh place in the first heat and not progressing to the final. He went on to represent Great Britain at the 1954 European Athletics Championships in Bern, again going out in the heats.

In 1954 he won the Midlands steeplechase championship.

Outside of athletics, he worked as an electrical engineer and was a car enthusiast, serving as chairman of the Morris Register club.

Johnson died on 12 December 2015 at his home in Oadby, aged 87.

References

1928 births
2015 deaths
Sportspeople from Leicester
English male long-distance runners
English male steeplechase runners
Olympic athletes of Great Britain
Athletes (track and field) at the 1952 Summer Olympics